The Celestinian Forgiveness (in Italian: Perdonanza Celestiniana) is a religious and historical annual event held in L'Aquila, Italy, at the end of August. It is a catholic jubilee celebration, established in 1294 by pope Celestine V with his bull Inter sanctorum solemnia (also known as Bull of Pardon or Bull of Forgiveness).

Since 2011 the celebration is a "Heritage of Italy for tradition" ("Patrimonio d'Italia per la tradizione") and in 2019 it was inscribed in the UNESCO Representative List of the Intangible Cultural Heritage of Humanity.

Notes

External links 
 Perdonanza Celestiniana – official website of the Celestinian Forgiveness, in Italian.

Annual events in Italy
Culture in Abruzzo
Intangible Cultural Heritage of Humanity
L'Aquila
Italian traditions